Ann Lee is a Hong Kong-born American author and commentator on global economics and finance issues.

Overview

Biography
Lee was born in Hong Kong to Chinese parents who had escaped from the turmoil of the early years of the PRC; subsequently the family emigrated to the United States. She attended U.C. Berkeley, Princeton University's Woodrow Wilson School of Public and International Affairs, and Harvard Business School (1995).  After working for two investments banks, she became a hedge fund partner and a trader in credit derivatives. She also taught at Pace University from 2006 to 2007. From 2010 to 2012 she was a senior fellow at Demos, where she worked on issues of financial regulation and U.S.-China
relations.

Writing
Her book What the U.S. Can Learn from China was published in January 2012 by Berrett-Koehler.  The book was described in The Economist magazine as "calling for a less hostile approach towards the rising Asian power".

Her op-ed pieces and editorials have been published in the Financial Times, Wall Street Journal  Newsweek, Business Week, Forbes, Huffington Post, The American Prospect  and Institutional Investor.

Media appearances

She has been a frequent media commentator on economic issues. She has appeared on Bloomberg, CNBC, ABC, CBS, CNN, NPR, VOA, C-SPAN and many foreign stations that include BBC, CCTV-America, Phoenix TV, Al Jazeera, and Swedish TV. She also makes several appearances each year as an invited speaker at industry and academic conferences.

Publishing history

References

External links
  Personal Page of Professor Ann Lee
 Ann Lee speaker's reel (4min video)

Living people
American derivatives traders
American economics writers
American finance and investment writers
American hedge fund managers
American investment bankers
American writers of Chinese descent
Harvard Business School alumni
Hong Kong emigrants to the United States
New York University faculty
Pace University faculty
Princeton School of Public and International Affairs alumni
University of California, Berkeley alumni
American academics of Chinese descent
Year of birth missing (living people)